Kristian Ronald Sarkies (born 25 October 1986 in Melbourne, Australia) is an Australian footballer who plays for Sandringham SC in the Victorian Metropolitan League 1. He grew up in Dingley Village, a suburb in Melbourne's South-East 10 kilometres from his current club in Beaumaris. His previous spells include at A-League clubs Melbourne Victory, Adelaide United and Melbourne Heart. More recently he has played in the NPL.

Club career

South Melbourne 
After impressing at the VIS in the youth league, Sarkies was signed to Australian Football powerhouse South Melbourne FC at 16-Years old.

Sarkies made his league debut in round 5 against the Newcastle Breakers as a 16-Year old. Sarkies performance as a youngster for South led to his first international youth call up for Australia.

In his one and only season with South Melbourne, Sarkies made 17 appearances and scored 1 goal. Following the demise of the NSL, Sarkies was allowed to leave South Melbourne and made the jump to the newly formed A-League.

Sarkies played in the A-league Grand Final with Melbourne Victory, he scored his third goal for the club in his team's 6-0 thrashing of Adelaide in the 90th minute and scoring from long range. However it was upon collecting his championship medal that he made headlines around the country by kissing Australian Prime Minister John Howard on his bald head.

Adelaide United
On 30 March 2007, Sarkies signed a one-year deal with Adelaide United, linking up with his Australian U23 teammates Bruce Djite, Nathan Burns and Robert Cornthwaite. Days after his arrival, captain Ross Aloisi signed with new team Wellington Phoenix, paving the way for Sarkies to become a key player in the Reds midfield brigade. On 28 December after Adelaide's loss to Sydney 3–1 at Adelaide Oval in which Sarkies scored a goal; he complained of a sore arm during the game and was later hospitalized then diagnosed with a deep vein thrombosis (DVT) in his arm at the end of December.

Sarkies signed a new deal with United in May 2008 that kept him at the club until the end of the A-League 2009-10 season. Sarkies set up Sasa Ognenovski from a well taken free kick to score a goal in his 50th A-League game in Adelaide's 2–0 win over Sydney FC Despite an inauspicious start to his Adelaide career Sarkies influence on the team began to show with the injury to fellow playmaker Diego culminating with his first goal of the 2008–09 season which turned out to be the only goal of the round 17 clash against Perth Glory at Members Equity Stadium. He followed it up a week later providing assists for both goals in the 2–0 win over Sydney FC at Adelaide Oval on 3 January 2009.

Melbourne Heart
After a mixed year with injuries, and not having cemented himself in Adelaide's first XI, he was heavily linked with a move to the new A-League club Melbourne Heart, coming into the competition in the 2010–11 season. The move was confirmed on 24 November 2009 with Sarkies becoming the club's first signing. On 6 April 2012 it was announced that he would be leaving the club.

Goulburn Valley Suns
After spells in the then Victorian Premier League with Heidelberg United, Port Melbourne Sharks, and Bulleen Lions, Sarkies signed for Shepparton-based Goulburn Valley Suns' inaugural year in the new state top-level league, the National Premier Leagues Victoria, as Bulleen Lions had been placed in the lower NPLV1 Division. Sarkies scored on his debut in a 2–3 home loss against fellow regional side Ballarat Red Devils on 29 March 2014.

International career
Sarkies was called up by coach Guus Hiddink to be part of the "train-on" squad leading up to Australia's appearance at the 2006 FIFA World Cup.  He won his first cap in the dying minutes of Australia's 3-1 friendly win against Liechtenstein on 8 June 2006. He was then kept in Germany with the Socceroos after he was given a personal invitation from Guus Hiddink to stay with the team until after the first group match with Japan.

Sarkies has represented his country at all youth levels and was involved in Australia's qualifying campaign for the Beijing 2008 Olympics. The first game of this campaign was against Chinese Taipei at Hindmarsh Stadium on 7 February 2007. Australia won the match 11–0, with Sarkies scoring four goals.

Career statistics 
(Correct as of 29 December 2008)

1 - includes A-League final series statistics
2 - includes FIFA Club World Cup statistics; AFC Champions League statistics are included in season commencing after group stages (i.e. 2008 ACL in 2008-09 A-League season etc.)

Honours

Club
Melbourne Victory:
 A-League Championship: 2006-2007
 A-League Premiership: 2006-2007

Country
Australia:
 OFC U-20 Championship: 2005
 OFC U-17 Championship: 2003

References

External links
 Ultimate A-League profile
 Oz Football profile

1986 births
Living people
Soccer players from Melbourne
Australia international soccer players
South Melbourne FC players
Melbourne Victory FC players
Adelaide United FC players
Melbourne City FC players
A-League Men players
Footballers at the 2008 Summer Olympics
Olympic soccer players of Australia
National Soccer League (Australia) players
Victorian Institute of Sport alumni
Port Melbourne SC players
Goulburn Valley Suns FC players
National Premier Leagues players
Association football midfielders
Australian soccer players
People from Dingley Village, Victoria